Going Down or Goin' Down may refer to:

Film and television
 Going Down (film), a 1983 Australian film directed by Haydn Keenan
 Going Down, a 2003 film starring Renée Estevez
 "Going Down" (Beavis and Butt-Head), a 2011 television episode
 Going Down, a travel and diving web series featuring Sarah Monahan

Music

Albums
 Going Down (album), by Client, 2004

Songs
 "Goin' Down" (Greg Guidry song), 1982
 "Going Down" (Jon Stevens song), 1993
 "Goin' Down" (Melanie C song), 1999
 "Goin' Down" (The Monkees song), 1967
 "Going Down", by A from Hi-Fi Serious, 2002
 "Going Down", by Don Nix, recorded by Moloch, Freddie King, Jeff Beck, and others
 "Goin' Down", by Godsmack from Awake, 2000
 "Goin' Down", by Group 1 Crew from Fearless, 2012
 "Goin' Down", by Ol' Dirty Bastard from Return to the 36 Chambers: The Dirty Version, 1995
 "Goin' Down", by the Pretty Reckless from Light Me Up, 2010
 "Going Down", by Ringo Starr from Old Wave, 1983
 "Going Down", by the Stone Roses, the B-side of "Made of Stone", 1989
 "Goin' Down", by Three Days Grace from Life Starts Now, 2009
 "Going Down", by Watsky from X Infinity, 2016
 "Going Down!", by XXXTentacion from ?, 2018

Other uses
 Going up and going down, a concept in commutative algebra
 Oral sex

See also
 Get down, a dance move in African and African diaspora culture
 Go Down (disambiguation)
 I'm Going Down (disambiguation)
 Coming Down (disambiguation)